The Azovstal Iron and Steel Works, or Azovstal Metallurgical Combine (PFTS: AZST), was a metallurgical facility located in Mariupol in eastern Ukraine, and one of the largest steel rolling companies in the country.

The Azovstal plant became one of the most emblematic points of the Siege of Mariupol during the Russian invasion of Ukraine. The plant had tunnels and bunkers capable of withstanding a nuclear attack, making it an extremely defensible position. As the Russian forces advanced into Mariupol, Ukrainian forces withdrew to Azovstal, and by late April it became the last pocket of Ukrainian resistance. The Battle of Azovstal occurred on the site, culminating in the surrender of the remaining Ukrainian defenders after over a month of resistance.

The plant was almost completely destroyed by Russian bombardment over the course of the battle. After the capture of Mariupol by the Russians, they announced plans for the plant to be demolished during the city's restoration.

History

20th century

Establishment 
Azovstal was established in 1930 in Mariupol, Ukrainian SSR (Soviet Union) by the decision of the Presidium of the Supreme Soviet of the National Economy (BCHX) (USSR) and began production in 1933 when its blast furnace put out the first iron. In January 1935, steelmaking production began at Azovstal with the commissioning of the first 250-ton tilting open hearth furnace in the Soviet Union.

Key people involved in the planning of the construction of Azovstal included Sergo Ordzhonikidze (head of the Supreme Soviet of the National Economy), Valerian Kuybyshev (chairman of the State Planning Committee) and the Mariupol native Andrei Zhdanov.

It was claimed by Soviet Union officials to be one of the most modern plants in the country, with structures built for both workers and their families outside of the factories. Prior to the Nazi invasion, it reportedly had more than 12,000 worker homes, schools, movie theaters, a hospital and maternity clinic, and two parks.

World War II 

During World War II, operations were forced to stop in 1941 when Nazi Germany occupied Mariupol. As part of the German  (1942–1943) the plant was used to produce ammunition from 1942 onward.

In September 1943, upon the city's recapture by Soviet forces, the plant was rebuilt.

Ukrainian independence 

In 1991, after the independence of Ukraine, the plant became a property of the Ukrainian state. In 1996, the state started its privatization. The plant became owned by Metinvest, a metallurgical company solely owned by the Ukrainian business conglomerate Systems Capital Management.

21st century 

In 2005, the plant produced 5.906 million tons of steel. From 2006, it partnered with the Priazovskiy State Technical University to help streamline students into working at the site. In 2011, it was the country's third largest steel producer, accounting for 15% of the entire steel output, and known as a large exporter of steel slabs and billets.
In 2014, the bunkers under the factory were used when Russian-backed Donbas separatists tried to take Mariupol from the Ukrainian government.

Environmental protests and reforms 
In a 1999 study, it was found that the site had been identified by a regional environmental protection agency as the second largest air polluter in the region. To attempt to lessen pollution amounts, a small pilot program was first implemented to mitigate pollution caused by graphite and smelter fumes, and was introduced in a larger scale after beneficial outcomes were shown. The site also implemented regular pollution prevention audits each year.

As a result of lax environmental regulations and "totally obsolete" equipment used by Azovstal and other Metinvest-owned factories in the city, Mariupol was what National Geographic described as "one of the most polluted cities" in Ukraine. In 2018 and 2019, residents of Mariupol protested in the streets for reform.

Russian invasion of Ukraine 
 
In March 2022, during the Siege of Mariupol, the works was badly damaged, with Ukrainian parliament member Serhiy Taruta stating that Russian forces had "practically destroyed the factory". By 16 April, it became the last pocket of organized resistance in the siege. Russian forces gave the defenders until 6:00 AM Moscow Time on 17 April to surrender, claiming that if they left behind their weapons they would guarantee their lives. Ukrainian forces refused to surrender and portions of the plant remained under their control.

On 4 May, Russian troops claimed to have entered the steel plant after launching an all-out offensive. However, this was refuted by Ukrainian sources, claiming they had repelled some Russian attacks. On 7 May, Deputy Prime Minister Iryna Vereshchuk stated, "The president's order has been carried out: all women, children, and the elderly have been evacuated from Azovstal. This part of the Mariupol humanitarian operation has been completed." According to The New York Times, the Azov Battalion was ordered to surrender by the Ukrainian General Staff on 16 May, saying “The supreme military command ordered the commanders of the units stationed at Azovstal to save the lives of the personnel... Defenders of Mariupol are the heroes of our time”. Efforts were ongoing to evacuate the battalion from the bunkers.

Rap group Kalush Orchestra, who represented Ukraine in the Eurovision Song Contest 2022 and later won the competition, called to save the soldiers at Azovstal onstage following their performance. This contributed to a sharp increase in global interest in Azovstal.

On 17 May 2022, fifty-three seriously injured people surrendered and were evacuated from Azovstal to a medical facility in Novoazovsk and 211 people were taken to Olenivka through the humanitarian corridor, marking the end of the combat mission in Mariupol and the defense of the Azovstal plant after 82 days of fighting.

Following the capture of Mariupol by the DPR and Russian forces and the surrender of remaining Ukrainian servicemen in Azovstal, Denis Pushilin announced that the plant would be demolished and that "other projects are planned in place of Azovstal". On February 25, 2023 Pushilin announced that a technopark would be built on the territory of Azovstal.

Layout

Production

The works included coke production, a sinter plant, six blast furnaces and a steel-making complex.

Management
The steel plant operated as a subsidiary of Metinvest Holding LLC, in turn a subsidiary of Metinvest B.V., at the time of the siege.

Rinat Akhmetov is co-owner of Metinvest B.V. Akhmetov supported the Ukrainian forces in the fight for Mariupol: “Mariupol has always been and will be a Ukrainian city. Ukrainians fiercely defend every inch of Ukrainian soil. I am proud that Azovstal is our bastion of resistance”.

See also
Azot (Sievierodonetsk), last Ukrainian position in Sievierodonetsk before its fall to Russia
Azovstal railway station
Metal production in Ukraine

References

External links 

Azovstal in figures

1930 establishments in Ukraine
2022 disestablishments in Ukraine
Former buildings and structures in Ukraine
Defunct companies of Ukraine
Companies based in Mariupol
Economy of Donetsk Oblast
Metinvest
Siege of Mariupol
Steel companies of the Ukrainian Soviet Socialist Republic
Steel companies of Ukraine
Buildings and structures destroyed during the 2022 Russian invasion of Ukraine